Oroch (or alternatively Orochon) could refer to:
the Oroch language
the Oroch people